Konstantin Sarnatskiy (born 16 October 1971) is a retired Uzbekistani long jumper.

He finished eleventh at the 1995 World Indoor Championships, and on the regional level he won the 1995 and 1997 Central Asian Games as well as the bronze medal at the 1994 Asian Games. He finished sixth at the 1998 Asian Games, and also competed at the 1995 World Championships without reaching the final.

His personal best time was 8.10 metres, achieved at the 1994 Asian Games in Hiroshima.

References

1971 births
Living people
Uzbekistani male long jumpers
World Athletics Championships athletes for Uzbekistan
Asian Games bronze medalists for Uzbekistan
Asian Games medalists in athletics (track and field)
Athletes (track and field) at the 1994 Asian Games
Athletes (track and field) at the 1998 Asian Games
Medalists at the 1994 Asian Games
20th-century Uzbekistani people
21st-century Uzbekistani people